Mohammadabad-e Ali Akbar Khan (also Romanized as Moḩammadābād-e ‘Alī Akbar Khān) is a village in Seylatan Rural District, in the Central District of Bijar County, Kurdistan Province, Iran. At the 2006 census, its population was 62, in 11 families. The village is populated by Kurds.

References 

Towns and villages in Bijar County
Kurdish settlements in Kurdistan Province